Wallerstein is a municipality and former principality in the district of Donau-Ries in Bavaria in Germany.

It was first mentioned in 1238 as Steinheim. For generations ruled by the House of Oettingen-Wallerstein, in 1806 Wallerstein became part of the Kingdom of Bavaria by the process of mediatisation. The family still owns the Wallerstein Castle and its surrounding land.

Mayors 
 1972-2002: Manfred Schürer
since 2002: Joseph Mayer

Culture and Sights
 Castle Wallerstein
 Castle rock
 Old Jewish burial ground
 One of only three German Marian and Holy Trinity columns

Gallery

Notable inhabitants

 Yom-Tov Lipmann Heller (1579-1654), born in Wallerstein and later Rabbi of Prague, Nemirow and Krakow. He published a three-volume Mishnah commentary which is studied to this day. 
 Louis of Oettingen-Wallerstein (1791-1870), Bavarian statesman and prince
 William Berczy (1744-1813), painter, colonist and architect, co-founder of Toronto
 German General Theodor Busse
 Bernhard Mettenleiter (1822-1901), organist and composer

See also 
 Synagogues of the Swabian type (Wallerstein)

References

Further reading 
 Ludwig Brutscher: Wallerstein. Markt und Residenz. Beiträge zur Orts- und Grafschaftsgeschichte. Markt Wallerstein 1996.

External links 

  
 
 Amtliche Statistik (PDF; 1,3 MB)

Donau-Ries